Robert A. "Bob" Anderson (January 16, 1932 – October 25, 2006) was an American businessman and politician.

Anderson was born in Wadena, Minnesota and graduated from St. Thomas Academy. He received his bachelor's degree in finance from the University of Miami. Anderson served in the United States Army during the Korean War and was commissioned a corporal. He was a small business owner and manager. Anderson lived in Ottertail, Minnesota with his wife and family. He served in the Minnesota House of Representatives from 1977 to 1996 and was a Republican. He died from pancreatic cancer at his home on Otter Tail Lake in Ottertail, Minnesota.

Notes

1932 births
2006 deaths
People from Wadena, Minnesota
Military personnel from Minnesota
University of Miami alumni
Businesspeople from Minnesota
Republican Party members of the Minnesota House of Representatives
Deaths from cancer in Minnesota
Deaths from pancreatic cancer